"Black Diamond" is a song by the Bee Gees released on the album Odessa in 1969. The song was written by Barry, Robin & Maurice Gibb and featured lead vocals by Robin Gibb. It was included on the compilation Marley Purt Drive released in 1970.

Recording
This track was the first song recorded when the Bee Gees returned to England after initial sessions for the album in New York City, and was the first song not to feature lead guitarist Vince Melouney who had left after the New York sessions for the album. It was recorded twice, the first version ended to 4:00 was released on Sketches for Odessa in 2006. and the second version was released on the album. The intro features a guitar part played by Maurice, and the orchestral arrangement by Bill Shepherd. Barry Gibb did not feature on the demo version. The beginning of the song is similar but there are some vastly different lyrics in the verses.

Robin Gibb would return to the same lyrical theme for the song Diamonds on his 1984 album Secret Agent.

Personnel
 Robin Gibb – lead and harmony, piano, mellotron
 Barry Gibb – guitar, backing vocal
 Maurice Gibb – bass, piano, guitar, mellotron, backing vocal
 Colin Petersen – drums

References

1969 songs
Bee Gees songs
Songs written by Barry Gibb
Songs written by Robin Gibb
Songs written by Maurice Gibb
Song recordings produced by Robert Stigwood
Song recordings produced by Barry Gibb
Song recordings produced by Robin Gibb
Song recordings produced by Maurice Gibb